Grossman (variants include Grosmann, Grossmann, Großmann, etc. is a family name of Germanic origin, meaning large man.

 Adam Grossman, guitarist and singer for the band Skrew
 Albert Grossman, entrepreneur and manager in the American folk music scene
 Alex Grossmann (1930–2019), Croatian-French physicist
 Allan Grossman, member of the Legislative Assembly of Ontario
 Allen Grossman, American poet
 Angela Grossmann, Canadian artist 
 Ashley Grossman (born 1993), American water polo player
 Aubrey Grossman, (1911–1999), American attorney and Communist leader
 Austin Grossman, writer and game designer
 Avraham Grossman, professor emeritus for Jewish history
 Bathsheba Grossman, Santa Cruz, California artist
 Blake Grossman, chief executive officer of Barclays Global Investors
 Budd Grossman, American producer and screenwriter
 Burt Grossman, former American football defensive end
 Carl Großmann (1863–1922), German serial killer
 Dave Grossman (author), American author and ex-member of the United States Army
 Dave Grossman (game developer), American game programmer and game designer
 David Grossman, Israeli author
 Dieter Grossmann, digital artist
 Edith Grossman, American translator
 Emily Grossman, geneticist and science communicator
 Eric Grossman, American musician
 Ernst August Friedrich Wilhelm Grossmann (1863–1933), German astronomer
 Gene Grossman, the Jacob Viner professor of International Economics at Princeton University
 Gheorghe Grossman, Romanian politician
 Gregory Grossman, American economist
 Gustav Friedrich Wilhelm Grossmann, German actor, writer and stage director
 Haika Grossman, Israeli politician
 Hannes Grossmann, German death metal band member
 Heinrich Ernst Grosmann, a Danish composer
 Henryk Grossman, Polish-German economist and historian
 Ignaz Grossmann (1825–1897), Hungarian-born rabbi in Moravia, Croatia, and America
 Jerome Grossman (1917–2013), American activist
 Jiří Grossmann, Czech theatre actor, poet and composer
 Joel Grossman, Professor of Political Science at Johns Hopkins University
 Jonathan Grossman, Revolutionized Corporal Law Theories
 Judith Grossman, American writer
 Karl Grossman, professor of journalism at State University of New York/College at Old Westbury
 Karol Grossmann, the first Slovene amateur filmmaker
 Karolien Grosemans, Belgian politician
 Kurt Grossmann, German journalist
 Larry Grossman (politician), politician in Ontario, Canada
 Larry Grossman (composer), composer of Broadway musicals
 Leslie Grossman, American actress
 Lev Grossman, American writer
 Louis Grossmann (1863–1926), Austrian-American rabbi
 Loyd Grossman, Anglo-American television presenter and chef
 Marc Grossman, former American ambassador to Turkey
 Marcel Grossmann, Hungarian mathematician
 Mary Belle Grossman (1879 – 1977), American judge and suffragist
 Martin Grossman (1965–2010), American murderer
 Mindy Grossman, CEO of HSN, Inc.
 Nancy Grossman, American artist
 Naomi Grossman, American actress
 Natalia Grossman, (born 2001), American sport climber
 Nicklas Grossmann, Swedish ice hockey player
 Randy Grossman (born 1952), American NFL football player
 Rex Grossman, former NFL quarterback
 Rex Grossman Sr., American football linebacker and fullback
 Richard Grossman (bassist), bassist for the Hoodoo Gurus and the Divinyls
 Richard Grossman (publisher), American publisher, founder of Grossman Publishers
 Richard Grossman (author) (1943–2011), American anti-globalization writer
 Richard Grossman (pianist) (1937–1992), American jazz pianist
 Robbie Grossman, American MLB outfielder
 Robert Grossman, American painter, sculptor, filmmaker, and author
 Robert Lee Grossman,  American computer scientist and bioinformatician
 Rudolph Grossman (1867–1927), Austrian-American rabbi
 Sally Grossman, widow of Albert Grossman and operator of the Woodstock-based Bearsville Records
 Sanford J. Grossman, American economist, John Bates Clark Medal winner in 1987
 Siegfried Grossmann, (born 1930), German theoretical physicist
 Stefan Grossman, American guitarist and singer
Steven Grossman, American politician and investor
 Thomas Grossmann, (born 1951), German writer and psychologist
 Tuvia Grossman, Jewish American student attacked by a violent Arab mob and later wrongly identified as a Palestinian
 Vasily Grossman, Soviet writer and journalist
 Victor Grossman, American socialist and writer
 Wayne Grossman, British financier, trader and Wealth Manager.
 Yitzchak Dovid Grossman, Israeli rabbi - the "Disco Rabbi"

See also 
 Grossmann Jet Service, Aviation company in Prague, Czech Republic
 Grossmann, a German place name in Moselle, France

German-language surnames